Sethupathi IPS is a 1994 Indian Tamil-language action film directed by P. Vasu, starring Vijayakanth and Meena. The film, produced by AVM Productions, deals with the story of a police officer who fights against terrorism. It is one of the blockbusters of Vijayakanth during the 1990s.

Plot 
Terrorism against India is escalated heavily by Indians trained abroad. Sethupathi IPS is a very efficient cop whose entire family has served the country at some time — his mother Satyabhama is an IAS Officer, his maternal grandfather was a soldier who got a medal for killing 200 enemies (a medal which Sethupathi secretly covets), and his father in law is an Inspector General of Police.

Sethupathi catches terrorist Sivasubramaniam in a hospital and coaxes him to reveal information that their gang is planning a terrorist strike on the Prime minister of India during his meeting with Chief Ministers of various states in Chennai. After divulging this information (owing to the kindness and pity shown by Sethupathi), the terrorist commits suicide with Sethupathi's gun. Using the information, Sethupathi is able to save the day and the Prime minister.

Sivasubramaniam's death leads to his brother Sivaprakasham arriving in India. Sivaprakasham is also the leader of this terrorist gang, and in addition to the terror strike the gang is planning to launch in India, he also plans to wipe out Sethupathi's family.

Moving opposite to Sethupathi's house, Sivaprakasam pretends to be a very nice man "Satyaprakasham" and manages to fool Sethupathi's mother, wife, sister, and grandfather and convinces all of them of his true intentions to such an extent that they agree to his engagement with their mute daughter Saraswathi. Sivaprakasam avoids Sethupathi and sees to it that during both the engagement and the wedding, Sethupathi is occupied so that he cannot come face to face with Sivaprakasam.

After the wedding, the Terrorists take over a school where Sethupathi's wife is a teacher and demands for a plane and money to take them abroad. Sivaprakasam brings his wife (Sethupathi's sister) and watches her get gang raped until Sethupathi's wife shoots her, unable to bear her suffering. Sivaprakasam also shoots a boy student of class v.

As the terrorists escape the school towards the plane and take off, Sethupathi has arrived after having killed one of their numbers, and disguising himself, he eliminates all of them, including Sivaprakasam and lands the plane safely (on instructions of the injured pilot).

The movie ends with Sethupathi receiving his coveted grandfather's medal.

Cast 
Vijayakanth as DCP Sethupathy IPS
Meena as Chandramathi
M. N. Nambiar as Ramarathnam
Srividya as Sathyabama
Kavery as Saraswathi
Vijayakumar as Head of Police
Kazan Khan as Sivaprakash/Shantharam 
Delhi Ganesh
Mohan Raman as the police inspector
Goundamani as Muthaiya
Senthil
Kovai Sarala
Thyagu

Soundtrack 
The music was composed by Ilaiyaraaja.

Release and reception 
Sethupathi IPS was released on 14 January 1994, and distributed by AVM Productions. The Indian Express wrote, "Director Vasu draws inspiration from [..] few real-life incidents. But somehow these incidents stand apart [..] the film as a whole is little too glib and superficial." Thulasi of Kalki wrote that the director has plagiarised scenes from Cliffhanger and felt he seemed to have taken an oath that he would not move out from the formula even a bit.

References

External links 
 

1990s action films
1990s Tamil-language films
1994 films
AVM Productions films
Fictional Indian police officers
Fictional portrayals of the Tamil Nadu Police
Films about terrorism in India
Films directed by P. Vasu
Films scored by Ilaiyaraaja
Indian action films
Indian police films